The Aitoliko–Katochi railway was a metre gauge railway line of the Railways of Northwestern Greece.  The line branched off the Kryoneri–Agrinio railway at Aitoliko station.

The line first opened in 1912 and united the city and the island of Aitoliko with the rest of the country on both sides of the lagoon via the two bridges which still serve the island and the city today. At the time, they were of mixed traffic (railroad and road). Katochi Station was located on the bank of the river Acheloos, across from the settlement of Katochi.

The line shut down except for freight services in 1943 by the Italian occupying forces who scraped it away, using the material to extend the Kryoneri–Agrinio line to Amfilochia. This construction began but was never completed due to the Italian surrender in early September. Very few traces remain today of the Aitoliko–Katochi line.

References

 
 

Railway lines opened in 1912
Railway lines closed in 1943
Aetolia-Acarnania
Railway lines in Greece
Defunct railroads
Metre gauge railways in Greece
1912 establishments in Greece